George Hill Hodel Jr. (October 10, 1907 – May 17, 1999) was an American physician and suspect in the murder of  Elizabeth Short, the Black Dahlia. He was never formally charged with the crime. He was also accused of raping his daughter, Tamar Hodel, but was acquitted for that crime. He lived overseas several times, primarily between 1950 and 1990 in the Philippines.

Personal life
George Hill Hodel Jr. was born on October 10, 1907, and raised in Los Angeles, California.  His parents, George Hodel Sr. and Esther Hodel, were of Russian Jewish ancestry. Their only son, he was well-educated and highly intelligent (scoring 186 on an early IQ test). He was also a musical prodigy. Hodel attended South Pasadena High School, graduated at age 15 and entered California Institute of Technology (Caltech) in Pasadena. He was forced to leave the university after one year, due in part to a sex scandal involving a professor's wife. He had impregnated the woman and wanted to raise their child together, but she refused. The affair between Hodel and the woman caused her marriage to fall apart.

By around 1928, Hodel was in a common-law marriage with a woman named Emilia; they had a son, Duncan. In the 1930s, he was legally married to Dorothy Anthony, a fashion model from San Francisco; they had a daughter, Tamar.

Hodel graduated from Berkeley pre-med in June 1932. He immediately afterward enrolled in medical school at the University of California, San Francisco  and received his medical degree in June 1936.

After the success of his medical practice and becoming head of the county's Social Hygiene Bureau, Hodel was moving in affluent Los Angeles society by the 1940s. He was enamored of the darker side of Surrealism and the decadence surrounding that art scene, befriending photographer Man Ray, film director John Huston and their associates. With Ray and some other Surrealists, he shared an interest in sadomasochism; with the young men of the Hollywood scene, he shared a fondness for partying, drinking, and womanizing.

In 1940, Hodel married Dorothy Harvey, John Huston's ex-wife. He called her "Dorero" to avoid confusion with his other wife, Dorothy Anthony, at least within their circle, but she is better known as Dorothy Huston-Hodel.

Hodel purchased the Sowden House in 1945 and lived there from 1945 until 1950. The structure, built in 1926 by Lloyd Wright (son of the noted American architect Frank Lloyd Wright), has since been registered as a Los Angeles historic landmark. Hodel was effectively a polygamist: in the late 1940s, around the time of the deaths of Spaulding and Elizabeth Short, Hodel was living with "Dorero" and their three children; his first legal wife Dorothy Anthony and their daughter Tamar; and, at times, his original common-law wife, Emilia, mother of Hodel's eldest child (by that time an adult). He was also prone to taking temporary lovers; a witness later suggested such a relationship between Hodel and Short.

Hodel left the United States in March 1950 for Hawaii, then a U.S. territory, where he married an upper-class Filipino woman, Hortensia Laguda. After another four children, they divorced in the 1960s; she was later a member of the Philippine Congress as Hortensia Starke. Hodel returned to the United States in 1990. He married (legally) for the fourth time, to a woman named June, in San Francisco, where he remained for the rest of his life. He died in 1999, at the age of 91.

Murder and rape suspect

On January 15, 1947, the naked body of 22-year-old Elizabeth Short was discovered in an empty lot in the Leimert Park neighborhood of Los Angeles. Short had suffered gruesome mutilation, notably her body being cut in half at the waist, as well as her mouth being cut ear to ear. The case earned major publicity and prompted one of the largest investigations in the history of the Los Angeles Police Department. The case was never solved. However, authorities at the time interviewed hundreds of suspects and focused seriously on about 25, including Hodel. However, suspicion of Hodel was not publicly known until decades later.  

In late 1949, Hodel's teenage daughter Tamar accused him of incestuous sexual abuse and impregnating her. He was acquitted after a widely publicized trial. Two witnesses to the alleged abuse testified at the trial. A third recanted her earlier testimony and refused to come forward, with one theory being that Hodel threatened her into silence. Tamar's testimony was perceived as contradictory and attention-seeking.

Hodel came to police attention as a suspect in the Elizabeth Short murder in 1949 after the sexual abuse trial. Known or suspected sex criminals in the area were being investigated for the Short case, and it had come out in that trial that Tamar had allegedly claimed her father was the Dahlia killer. Hodel's medical degree also aroused suspicion, given the hypothesis that whoever bisected Short's body had some degree of surgical skill. At least eight witnesses claimed first-hand knowledge of a 1946 relationship between Short and Hodel, then back in Los Angeles from China. The full details of the investigation came to light only in 2003, when a "George Hodel–Black Dahlia File" was discovered in archives at the Los Angeles County District Attorney's office. The file revealed that in 1950, Hodel was a suspect of the Dahlia murder. His Hollywood residence was electronically bugged by an 18-man DA/LAPD task force between February 15 and March 27, 1950.  The DA tapes recorded him saying: 

Hodel was also interviewed as a suspect in the nearby June 1949 murder of Louise Springer, the "Green Twig Murder", though evidence to support this accusation was not publicly available until July 2018.

In October 1949, Hodel's name was mentioned in a formal written report to the grand jury as one of five prime suspects in the Short murder, but none of the named suspects were submitted to the grand jury for consideration for indictment, as the investigation was still ongoing. 

Hodel obtained a degree in psychiatry and counseled prisoners in the Territorial prison in Hawaii for three years, then moved on to the Philippines, where he started a new family, and appears to have remained until 1990, finally dying in 1999 in San Francisco without charges ever being filed. However, his son Steve has written that he believes Hodel re-entered the United States multiple times each year from 1958 through 1988 and specifically in 1966–1969 to commit more murders, and then return to the Philippines.

Additionally, in 2021 Steve Hodel published a two-part investigation (The Early Years: The Further Serial Crimes of George Hodel M.D. Thoughtprint Press) presenting possible crimes committed in Northern and Southern California by George Hodel in the 1920s and 1930s. The son makes a clear disclaimer that "none of the presented crimes contain proof beyond a reasonable doubt and without hard physical evidence such as DNA linkage are not solvable." Hodel, the younger's investigation presents four potential crimes committed in the 1920s and nineteen crimes believed committed in the 1930s. Thirteen of these crimes were originally investigated and believed serially connected by the San Diego Sheriff's and Police Departments back in the 1930s, but a suspect was never identified. Two separate victims from the 1930s cases attended school with George Hodel and the suggested motive, as in many of his crimes, was his hatred of being rejected by them in his youth. If George Hodel did in fact commit these additional "early-years crimes" then it would make him one of the nation's most prolific serial killers. His "crime spree" would total fifty victims over a nearly fifty-year time period.

Reactions
After Hodel died in 1999, his son Steve Hodel, a former LAPD homicide detective, started investigating his father as a possible suspect in the Elizabeth Short murder and has written several books on the subject. 

A September 2006 episode of Cold Case Files, hosted by Bill Kurtis, illustrates the mixed reaction to Steve Hodel's hypothesis as outlined in his first book, Black Dahlia Avenger (2003). Head Deputy District Attorney Stephen Kay described himself as highly impressed by Steve Hodel's research and conclusions and even went so far as to declare the case had been solved. Less impressed was active Detective Brian Carr, the LAPD officer then in charge of the Black Dahlia case which was still officially open. Carr's opinion was that Hodel's theory was based on a few intriguing facts linked together by unsubstantiated supposition. Short's relatives also disagreed that the photos in Hodel's album were of Short. Carr added that if he ever took a case as weak as Steve Hodel's to a prosecutor he would be "laughed out of the office". Carr, admitting that he had not read all of Steve Hodel's materials, added, "I don't have the time to either prove or disprove Hodel's investigation. I am too busy working on active cases."  Steve Hodel has since produced two additional books on the Dahlia case, and several books on the Zodiac killer and other cases, attempting to link them to his father.

In July 2018, Sandi Nichols of Indianapolis, Indiana, while going through her recently deceased mother's personal effects, discovered a "Dying Declaration Letter" written by her grandfather, W. Glenn Martin, dated October 26, 1949. The handwritten envelope read, "In case of Margaret Ellen's or Glenna Jean's Death" and was initialed "WGM"; the letter was written out of fear that one or both of his teenage daughters might be killed. The three-page letter identified W. Glenn Martin as a paid LAPD police informant working for a "Sgt. McCawley" (Sgt. McCauley, LAPD Internal Affairs Division). He described his activities as working undercover for LAPD detectives to help them identify and arrest corrupt police officers; in his words, "... it was to try and see if other officers could be inveigled into crime."  The Martin letter, reproduced in full in the chapter "Afterword" in Black Dahlia Avenger III, went on to name "GH" on 17 separate occasions identifying him as a personal acquaintance of Martin's as well as of McCauley's, and named him as the killer of both Short and of a second lone woman, Louise Springer, the "Green Twig Murder" victim. Martin's letter claimed that both he and "GH" personally knew Springer and that he believed "GH" had also killed her. LAPD at that time was actively investigating the Springer and Black Dahlia murders and had publicly identified them as "probably connected". Springer was garroted on June 13, 1949, just two blocks from where Short's body was found in 1947.

Included in the letter was the fact that LAPD, after being informed that "GH" knew victim Springer, brought "GH" in to be "grilled about the Springer murder." The Martin letter made it clear that "GH" was known and protected by law enforcement officers, and that they "let him go."  Martin's instructions were that his letter was to be opened only in case of harm coming to either of his daughters. No harm came to either of them so the letter remained unreported and in the family's possession for 70 years until discovered and read by Martin's granddaughter.

In popular culture 
In January 2019, the American TV network TNT simultaneously aired two "companion" productions. The first, a six-part limited television miniseries titled, I Am the Night, is a fictionalized drama focusing on the life of Fauna Hodel and her discovery that her grandfather, Dr. George Hill Hodel  (played by actor Jefferson Mays) was the prime suspect in the Black Dahlia Murder (in real life, Fauna Hodel never met her grandfather in person, though they had one phone conversation in which George informed Fauna of Tamar’s residing in Hawaii). Scenes for the series were shot on location at Dr. Hodel's 1945-50 residence, the historic Frank Lloyd Wright Jr.-built John Sowden House at 5121 Franklin Avenue, Hollywood, California.

The second project was an eight-part documentary podcast, entitled Root of Evil: The True Story of the Hodel Family and the Black Dahlia, a Cadence13/TNT production using archival audio and interviews with Hodel family members. The podcast includes many of the actual investigative findings and linkage of Dr. George Hodel to the Black Dahlia murder, establishing that according to secret police records he, in fact, knew and had dated the victim in the 1940s.

Both series surmise that Fauna might be both the granddaughter and the daughter of Hodel, though there is no evidence as to who her real father is. In 1949, George Hodel had been arrested and tried for incest by LAPD; his 14-year-old daughter Tamar accused him of raping her, resulting in a pregnancy she aborted. Dr. Hodel obtained criminal defense attorney Jerry Giesler and was acquitted after a three-week jury trial.  

The Root of Evil producer Zak Levitt was able to obtain DNA analysis and a review of the results by one of the world's leading experts, which positively eliminated Dr. George Hodel as the biological father of Fauna Hodel.

See also 
 Fauna Hodel — Hodel's granddaughter and true-crime author
 I Am the Night, a 2019 TNT Drama TV miniseries, featuring Jefferson Mays as George Hodel   
 Root of Evil: The True Story of the Hodel Family and the Black Dahlia

References

External links
 
 
 

1907 births
1999 deaths
American expatriates in the Philippines
American people of Russian-Jewish descent
Black Dahlia case
People acquitted of sex crimes
Suspected serial killers